Danna María García Osuna (born February 4, 1978) is a Colombian actress and model best known for playing main roles in telenovelas in Colombia, Mexico and the US.

Personal life 
She has one child, born in July 2017, from her relationship with Spanish journalist Iván González. On 19 April 2020 she announced that she had tested positive for COVID-19.

Filmography

Film

Television

References

External links
 

Living people
Colombian film actresses
Colombian television actresses
Colombian telenovela actresses
People from Medellín
21st-century Colombian actresses
20th-century Colombian actresses
1978 births